Saeed Chmagh (January 1, 1967 – July 12, 2007) was an Iraqi employed by Reuters news agency as a driver and camera assistant. He was killed, along with his colleague Namir Noor-Eldeen by American military forces in the New Baghdad district of Baghdad, Iraq, during an airstrike on July 12, 2007.

Life and career
Chmagh was born January 1, 1967, in Iraq. He joined Reuters before the United States-led invasion in 2003. With 4 children of his own, he financially supported his family and another three through his work. Chmagh also supported his sister's family after insurgents killed her husband. 

Chris Helgren, then Reuters' chief photographer in the region, launched a plan to employ and train Iraqis, with more local knowledge and access to areas now perilous for Westerners. Helgren said: "There are few 'good news' stories to be had in this war and wars by definition are tales of violence. And to get there, drivers like Saeed Chmagh are indispensable." "Saeed had a reputation of being fiercely loyal and appeared fearless to me. If you ever needed to get quickly to a dangerous area, passing chicanes of barbed wire and boobytraps, Saeed was your man. But he also had a very quiet, loving side and spoke often of his kids."

Airstrike and death

On July 12, 2007, after several skirmishes in the area, two American AH-64 Apache helicopters observed a group of people milling around on a street in Baghdad.  Believing the group to be the armed Iraqi insurgents who earlier engaged US soldiers nearby, the Apache fired on them. About 5 minutes later an unmarked black van arrived, owned by a man who was taking his son to school. Two other men arrived and assisted the severely-injured Chmagh (who was at that moment engaged in dragging himself over the ground in order to reach cover) and carried him to the van. The observing helicopter crews requested and received permission to engage, and opened fire on the van and its occupants. Two young children in the van were severely wounded by the shooting. Chmagh, and Reuters photojournalist, his long-time friend Namir Noor-Eldeen, were among those killed in the attacks. Chmagh was 40 years old at the time of his death. Chmagh and Noor-Eldeen were the fifth and sixth Reuters employees killed in Iraq since the 2003 invasion began. The Army's report includes pictures of what are claimed to be weapons found near the bodies at the scene. After their deaths, Reuters screened a photographic tribute to Noor-Eldeen and Chmagh in New York City's Times Square and London's Canary Wharf. The shootings, Chmagh's death, and Noor-Eldeen's death are detailed in The Good Soldiers, a 2009 non-fiction book by David Finkel.

Video release

For more than three years after the shooting, Reuters and other organizations sought probes into the deaths of Noor-Eldeen and other journalists killed in Iraq, but the U.S. military withheld key information on the grounds that it was classified. The military also refused to release a video taken from one of the gunships that captured the complete sequence and radio communication during the shootings. On April 5, 2010, the video was released on the website WikiLeaks, which said it acquired the video from military whistle-blowers and viewed it after breaking the encryption code.

References

External links
 Collateral Murder – WikiLeaks-owned alternate site, includes full footage of the video as originally released
 
 Massacre Caught on Tape: US Military Confirms Authenticity – video report by Democracy Now!

 

1967 births
2007 deaths
2000s in mass media
2010s in mass media
Iraq War
Journalists killed while covering the Iraq War
Reuters people
Photojournalism controversies
Filmed killings
Deaths by American airstrikes